Northeast Airlines Company (S: 东北航空公司, T: 東北航空公司, P: Dōngběi Hángkōng Gōngsī) was an airline based in Shenyang, People's Republic of China. The airline was rebranded as Hebei Airlines on June 29, 2010.

History
Northeast Airlines was established in 2006 as a subsidiary of Shenyang Aircraft. On November 8, 2007, the airline received its operation approval from the Civil Aviation Administration of China (CAAC). In 2010, it was rebranded as Hebei Airlines.

Fleet
As of October 2010, the Northeast Airlines fleet consists of the following aircraft with an average age of 8.4 years:

References

Defunct airlines of China
Airlines established in 2006
Chinese companies established in 2006
Airlines disestablished in 2010
2010 disestablishments in China